Juma Kaseja Juma (born 20 April 1985) is a Tanzanian footballer who currently plays as a goalkeeper for KMC FC. He is also a member of the Tanzania national team. Kaseja initially competed with Simba, leaving the club shortly after the season's conclusion. In his early years, he played with the Makongo Dar es Salaam and Serengeti Boys junior teams. Kaseja later registered with Moro United F.C. in 2000.

Club career 
In his early career, Kaseja attended Makongo Secondary School. He eventually played for their football team, Makongo Dar es Salaam. His performance at Makongo was followed by placement on the Serengeti Boys Under-17 team.

Kaseja signed with Moro United F.C. prior to the 2000–2001 season in Tanzanian football. He played his first two seasons completely, but was banned by the Tanzania Football Federation when he left to participate in the Gothia Cup, a youth football tournament based in Sweden. After the events at Morogoro, the goalkeeper transferred to Simba S.C. in the Tanzanian Premier League. He became an active member of the team beginning from 2009. On November 11, 2013, Kaseja was signed by Young Africans S.C., who were playing in the top tier of Tanzanian football as well. The acquisition was perceived as problematic due to the strong rivalry between both sides.

International career 
Kaseja represents Tanzania on international duty. He joined the national team in the year of 2001, holding the position as the second-string goalkeeper. After staying on the squad for more seasons, Kaseja won the starting job. However, his name was later dropped from the team's roster for nearly three years. Danish football manager Jan B. Poulsen, who had managed several other teams such as Armenia and Singapore, helped in recalling him back to the squad. He has been noted for poor performance against Morocco, allowing seven goals in three losses through his career. Kaseja helped the national team win their third title after his country hosted the 2010 CECAFA Cup, defeating Ivory Coast in the final match. In the 2012 CECAFA Cup semifinals against Uganda, Kaseja infamously made a pivotal blunder after dropping a potential save against the goal attempt by Robert Ssentongo.

References 

1985 births
Living people
Tanzanian footballers
Young Africans S.C. players
Simba S.C. players
Association football goalkeepers
Moro United F.C. players
Kagera Sugar F.C. players
Mbeya City F.C. players
People from Kigoma Region
Tanzania international footballers
Kinondoni Municipal Council F.C. players
Tanzanian Premier League players
Tanzania A' international footballers
2020 African Nations Championship players